The pneumonia of unknown etiology (PUE) surveillance system is a Chinese monitoring system, established in response to the 2002–2004 SARS outbreak to track emerging respiratory infections, including avian flu and SARS. On 29 December 2019, local hospitals in Wuhan, Hubei Province, China, identified four closely related people, linked to a local wet market, as having a “pneumonia of unknown etiology” using the national system. Their illness was later confirmed as COVID-19 due to SARS-CoV-2.

References 

Health informatics
COVID-19 pandemic in China